This article showcases characters from the television show The Adventures of the Galaxy Rangers.

Protagonists

Series 5 Rangers
All of the Rangers must touch their badges on their uniforms in order to activate their series 5 implants. The Rangers are:

Zachary Foxx
Zachary Foxx is the captain of the series 5 Rangers.  He was seriously injured in a battle with a space Pirate named Captain Kidd and his entire left side was replaced with bionics which allow him to fire blasts of energy with his left arm and gives him extraordinary strength. Within Captain Zachary Foxx, the implant's function is simply to act as a power conduit:  triggering the badge activates a sequence of events that supercharges his left-side bionics and enables either a boosting of the myomer muscles and tendons, or a channelling of bioelectrical energy through the bionic amplifiers to produce an energy blast of up to 16 standard carbine shots, which makes him capable of blasting a wall apart, spot-welding circuitry, or possibly punching through a ship's hull. He is married and a father of two. His wife's mind was kidnapped by the Queen of the Crown and is contained in a "psychocrystal".

Foxx was voiced by veteran actor Jerry Orbach.

Shane Gooseman
Shane "Goose" Gooseman was genetically produced in a test tube as part of a government genetic experiment to create a group of enhanced mutant soldiers known as "Supertroopers". A civilian adviser dosed the Supertroopers with a gas meant to speed up their mutation and make them more powerful, but it had the side effect of making the Supertroopers more aggressive and mentally unstable. Goose was at the firing range at the time, and thus avoided the gas, thereby becoming the only remaining unaffected trooper. The other troopers had to be cryogenically imprisoned, but some escaped. Goose was given the option to avoid cryogenic freezing on the condition that he join the Galaxy Rangers and hunt down the escaped Supertroopers. His series 5 bionic implants allow him limited control over his body's molecules giving him the ability to heal, absorb energies, and adapt to various environmental conditions by temporary shapeshifting. He is not a metamorph (i.e., he cannot choose specific forms), his power evolves and adapts his body to the environment he's in. Ranger Gooseman's implant supercharges his genetic bio-defenses, enabling them to react almost instantly, instead of minutes or hours, as would normally happen. This brings him close to the level of the rogue Supertroopers, and makes him the only one capable of going one-on-one with them in personal combat. His characterization is heavily inspired by Clint Eastwood. It is also noted during the show's credits that he is the only Supertrooper with compassion.

Niko
Niko is an archaeologist specialising in ancient cultures, and has innate psychic abilities. She carries a large gun and knows martial arts. Her series 5 implant boosts her psychic abilities and she can create shields, lift objects, and has clairvoyance. Ranger Niko's implant acts as a psionic amplifier, boosting her innate psionic abilities by adding power from the converted radiation into a psionic boost which can increase her range from simple tactile up to lightyears distant. She can also generate a shield of ambient energy which will dramatically drain her implant, but can be augmented by touching the other rangers and drawing power from them. This shield can defend against all forms of attack, but cannot be held for long. Throughout the series a romantic tension exists between her and Goose.

Born on the failed colony world of Alspeth, she was found after the destruction of her colony by Ariel from the haven world of Xanadu. Having been relocated to her new haven, Niko was raised and her psychic abilities were nurtured. At the age of 19, she left Xanadu to return to her people and joined the Galaxy Rangers. After the academy, she was accepted into the experimental Series 5 program. She was later assigned to the Series 5 Rangers as their mystic and archaeological expert - due to the number of missions they embarked on involving new cultures and varied belief systems.

Walter Hartford
Walter "Doc" Hartford is a swashbuckling character who fights with a sword, a gun, and his fists. He is a computer genius who, along with the BETA Scientist 'Q-Ball', is responsible for most of the automated systems that the Galaxy Rangers use daily. His series 5 implants allow him to control any computer system through the use of "programs" which appear as flying holographic computer animated geometric shapes that he can communicate with. Ranger Hartford's implant produces the oddest effects- and they still cannot properly be explained. Commander Walsh puts it best: Doc Hartford, your implant makes you a computer wizard, able to conjure fantastic programs.

It appears that Doc is able to bring his thoughts to life with the use of the implant and his Computer Diagnostic Unit; a compact computer which has advanced diagnostics and maintenance functions, along with sensory and computer linkage capability. The CDU acts as a focus for Doc's implant power, and also as a storage facility for his "tweakers" (Pathfinder, Tripwire, Firefly, Searchlight, Lifeline and Pixel); the computer programs that are part of his personality and which offer capabilities far beyond any normal computer program, virus, or worm.

Tweakers (in CDU): Tripwire and Pathfinder are most often called forward in the show, for unlocking, disabling or hacking into a lock or protected interfaces to access foreign computer systems (pathfinder more for data acquisition types of calls but can do similar things as "Tripwire"), Firefly more for brute force breaking into highly protected systems (quick exit kind of situations, where they don't care about how a computer system's condition is left afterwards), etc.). I'm not sure, but there is another one called "Trooper," will verify soon with an Episode number as reference as well.

Hartford, from the Island of Jamaica, was born to wealthy parents, and so he was educated in private school, topped off with Mrs. Abercrombies Charm and Finishing School. He left there to join the Ranger Corps after he signed up with some biochemical corporations to help them produce better computer programs, but found out that his skills were not being challenged.

Other

Eliza Foxx
She is kidnapped by the queen and held captive.

Waldo Zeptic
Waldo is the Ambassador from Andor and possibly creator of the Andorian hyperdrive. Very tall and distinguished, he is highly amusing when paired with Ambassador Zozo of Kirwin. The ambassadors are in very close contact with the Rangers and Commander Walsh at all times, and are friends of the Foxx family. Waldo is also a brilliant mathematician and engineer. He avoids violence, but will protect himself with a personal force field. However, if imprisoned or caged, he like other Andorians, loses control of his emotions and undergoes a de-evolution to a savage beast.

Zozo
Zozo is the ambassador from the farm planet of Kirwin. The Kiwi are very much the opposite of the Andorians; whereas the Andorians are a highly technical society and coolly logical people, the Kiwi are very "down-to-earth" and emotional. Zozo is cheerful, loves a good time, and approaches most everything with a sense of humor.

Commander Walsh
Commander Joseph Walsh is the Rangers' commanding officer, as well as the head of BETA, (Bureau for Extra-Terrestrial Affairs)  located in Beta Mountain. Brown hair (with grey at temples) brown eyes, assumed to be in his late forties. With Dr. Negata, he was in charge of the failed Supertrooper Project, of which Shane Gooseman is the only sane survivor. The Rangers are his friends, and Gooseman is something of the son he never had. He has been known to bend the rules for them such as when the Council of Leaders of the World Federation (typified by Senator Weiner) tried to put Goose behind bars for a crime he didn't commit. Walsh is something of a controversial character. It's implied in "Supertroopers" that he and Wheiner keep each other in check through a complicated web of mutual blackmail, and a series of "deals." Some of these "deals" involve bending the rules for his Rangers, but others might wind up harmful to them. He, Nagata, and Wheiner are the only ones who know about Shane being his "son".

Buzzwang
Buzzwang, or "Buzz" for short, is an android whose biggest dream was to become a ranger, which he eventually did. He is Q-ball's go-fer, and in his spare time, he likes to breakdance. There are two versions of Buzzwang, most notably the pre-Tune-up and post Tune-up model, though the "personality" remains completely intact.

Q-Ball
Q-Ball - a comic relief mad scientist.

Cybersteeds
The Cybersteeds - robot horses. They feature prominently in the opening credits. The Cybersteeds ridden by the Galaxy Rangers are the most advanced animatronic robots so far designed by the scientists at BETA and the Long Shot Research facility.

The Cybersteeds comprise fully intelligent Artificial Intelligences combined with robot chassis in the form of a horse - enabling speech, great stability, and speed over all types of terrain.

Each Ranger has a Cybersteed matched to them, and each horse is built especially for his or her rider. The four horses are Triton (silver, Goose), Voyager (blue, Niko [although Doc often rides her]), Mel (tan, Doc [although Niko often rides him]), and Brutus (gold, Zachary Foxx [although he is listed as Z100 in the DVD booklet]). All the cybersteeds are presumed male except for Voyager, and their riders change after the second episode.

Triton is the most prominent cybersteed; it is mentioned that he is the fastest and that no one but Goose may ride him. He is the only one to speak regularly, and Goose has a very strong bond with him, unlike the owners of the other cybersteeds. He is also the most technologically advanced cybersteed (a 5000 model).

After Triton, Voyager is the second most prominent. She is mentioned as having bugs in her system, which is evident in her reasoning and the fact that she can never get Doc's name right. She and Mel are presumed to be 4000 models, and Niko and Doc often switch cybersteeds, depending on the episode.

Brutus only speaks in one episode, but he is mentioned to be the least technologically advanced. However, even as a 3000 model, he is still the strongest cybersteed.

Antagonists

Captain Kidd
Captain Kidd is a Plitsky (a bird-like species) pirate. He was seen in "Phoenix" as a menacing, if bumbling, pirate that captured the ship transporting the Foxx family to Kirwin. Annoyed by the Queen's refusal to allow him to take the ship as a prize vessel and her decision to take control of the situation away from him, he turned on her.

This of course, made Kidd a wanted man. He cut a deal to aid the Rangers in exchange for a "trade alliance" and continued freedom ("New Phoenix"). Other appearances have him helping BETA make first contact with the xenophobic Traash and taking possession of a memory bird (talking android birds that are used to store sensitive data) that had half of its circuitry corrupted. He also sold counterfeit starstones to the Crown, powering an armada that threatened to destroy Earth until Kidd let the Rangers in on how easy it was to destroy the brittle fakes. Consequently, Kidd became indirectly responsible for the destruction of much of the Crown fleet.

Series Creator Robert Mandell admitted in Starlog that he intended Kidd to be much more threatening, but he "became our Harry Mudd."

Lazarus Slade
Lazarus Slade is a scientist who works for the Queen of the Crown and helps devise schemes to defeat the Galaxy Rangers.

Daisy O'Mega
Daisy O'Mega is a female space pirate who appeared in the episode, "Renegade Rangers". She stole the U.S.S. Cheyenne from the Space Navy during the Quadrant 4 War Games. She planned to use the Cheyenne to steal weapons from the Longshot research facility. Ms. O'Mega was very briefly a romantic interest for Shane Gooseman, which made Nico visibly jealous.

Nimrod the Cat
Nimrod the Cat a leonine humanoid villain wearing a multi-colored mane reminiscent of a rainbow wig. Nimrod was first seen in the episode "The Power Within", where he introduced himself as Hunter of the Horns and Gooseman says Nimrod escaped from the Deltoid Rock. In the story, Nimrod captures and deprives the Rangers of the use of their Series 5 badges, but using simple human skills, they pass his tests and prove themselves worthy of preservation.

In other appearances, he was less of a villain. His attempt to form a rock band in "Battle of the Bandits" met with resounding success, but the stage act of impersonating Slaverlords enraged the Queen, who saw to it that his backup band was replaced with real Slaverlords, and that Nimrod would be forced to capture the audience for the Queen's psychocrypt. Between the Rangers, and the rogue apprentice of Mogul the sorcerer, the plot fell to shambles and Nimrod escaped with his hide. In "Murder on the Andorian Express," he actually aided Doc and Niko in tracking a Crown assassin on a luxury liner, explaining it all away as a game and once again vanishing into the crowd.

Queen of the Crown
The Queen of the Crown is the head of a vast and crumbling empire. We see instances of Crown conquests and atrocities in "Tortuna" where it is explained that she destroyed virtually all of Tortuna's population outside of a handful of domed cities. In "Queen's Lair," she enslaves the planet Wollcam and manufactures a gigantic gun that blasts a hole in the moon, attempting to ransom Earth for 5000 human lives.

The Queen is an accomplished sorceress who often uses technology to make her considerable power all the more vile. Her psychocrypt and mind-link with the Slaverlords is but one example. In "Mindnet," she takes control of an experimental telepathy booster, which is later used in "Battle of the Bands" to control the minds of thousands of sentients attending a rock concert. Perhaps her most bone-chilling accomplishment was a machine that used Eliza's psychocrystal for power. It not only threatened to kill Eliza, but subjected Zachary to a form of mental torture. Driven to near insanity by the combination, he made a suicidal attempt to break into the Queen's palace. He was quickly captured and turned into a Slaverlord himself. The other three Rangers were able to rescue him, and the machine was rendered useless, but Eliza was never rescued during the series.

Scarecrow
The Scarecrow is an ancient, powerful alien monstrosity created for a long-ago war between the (then) technologically advanced Tarkon and a now-forgotten enemy. Even though the war is thousands of years over, he still is primarily motivated to destroy the living, ancient machine.

Upon defeat, it was forced into hibernation for uncounted millennia under the surface of the planet Granna (he mentions the figure "a hundred million years" but this could be an exaggeration). The entity was disturbed; forcibly awakened by a Kiwi agricultural analysis device whose rumbling thumpings stirred the creature back into consciousness.  Scarecrow sustains himself by draining, fatally, the life force of others. His first victims were a sheriff and deputy sent out on patrol from the colony, followed by one of the colonists. Niko almost became another of his victims, but Goose was able to track him to a farmhouse. It was here that Goose gave the entity the moniker "Scarecrow," named after a ghost story he heard from the locals. During the fight, the house caught fire, and Scarecrow was trapped inside while Goose and Zozo managed to flee. The Scarecrow was seen fleeing the burning house covered in flames and cackling maniacally.

Later appearances placed him draining entire Tarkonian villages of their lifeforce in an attempt to gain enough power to kill the Heart of Tarkon (another ancient weapon which could destroy him) ("Scarecrow's Revenge") and crashlanding on Mesa ("Aces and Apes"). In the final episode of the series, he infiltrates the Tarkonian court, exerting a powerful mental control over the court until Doc, Princess Maya, King Spartos, and the court Shaman reactivate the Heart and the defenses of the planet. The Heart dispatched the Scarecrow, but we can never know for sure if that was indeed the end of the hard-to-kill foe.

Supertroopers
The Supertroopers are a group of genetically engineered supersoldiers that Goose must hunt down. They include:

Brainchild
Brainchild is a genetically enhanced general for the supertroopers who is super-intelligent, paranoid, and arrogant, designed to be a master strategist.

Chimera
A female supertrooper, shapeshifter and illusionist, who uses deception and surprise to attack at will. She has combat techniques, advanced hand-to-hand combat skills, she has the ability to alter either her own appearance, or create an illusion within the minds of those around her, including supertroopers, that she has vanished or changed shape.

Darkstar
Her major ability is to be able to generate a field of darkness via a series of dark globules that move outwards from her and surround the target, effectively blinding them for a short periods of time. Her powers, enhanced by the Wolf Den incident, now enable her to produce permanent blindness in her targets, if she so desires. She also heals faster than a normal human, and has enhanced reflexes that enable her to be an effective close combat soldier. Stingray's lover, although Goose once had a crush on her.

Gravestone
Gravestone is designed to be the ultimate gladiatorial combat warrior. He has highly enhanced strength, thickened skin, and bulked muscle, to enable him to withstand most forms of hand-to-hand combat. Furthermore, Gravestone's chief genetic ability is be able to transform his skin into a hard, granite-like rock, enabling him to pound anything—even buildings—into rubble, and rendering him invulnerable to many forms of conventional attack.

As a result of his exposure to the X-Factor agent, Gravestone's powers can be enhanced further by absorbing energy, which supercharges his system, blowing his strength and shutting down his higher brain functions.

Jackhammer
Jackhammer is a front-line agent whose very fast reflexes enable him to live up to his name. Jackhammer was once clocked at two hundred blows per minute in testing. With the strength he can bring to bear, this level of impact can generate sympathetic vibrations in structures sufficient to collapse buildings and damage the foundations of bridges, etc.

He has also got one of the most active healing agents of any supertrooper, which is almost as effective as the Bio-Defence, but simply enables Jackhammer to get up again after any attack.

Ryker Killbane
Ryker Killbane is a bio-defense close combat soldier. In some ways, he is the prototype for the type of Soldier that Shane Gooseman was crafted on. During the early years at Wolf Den, since Shane was a late arrival, being much younger than the majority of the other Supertroopers, he was considered the 'baby' of the group. Killbane took a perverse pleasure in belittling the other man, going so far as to call him runt at almost every occasion. Killbane has bio-defense abilities similar to Gooseman's, but also has the ability to blow poison gas from glands in his mouth, much like a lizard or snake can release venom.  Ryker Killbane has become twisted by the genetic enhancement and has focused all his rage and anger on Shane Gooseman, whom he perceives as the enemy. This is both due to the rivalry they both participated in during their time at Wolf Den and the fact that Gooseman was always being 'coddled' by Walsh, and given somewhat preferential treatment. Killbane is very self-centered, always thinking of himself before anybody else - a holdover from the days at the project. In the encounters since the Wolf Den days, Killbane has tried to attack or disable Gooseman, the only one really capable of seriously injuring him outside of the other Supertroopers.

Stingray
Stingray is an Energy Projector. His primary ability is to be able to channel bio-electric energy along his optic nerves, which have been altered to lase the energy into a powerful beam of light. This capability was counted on to protect him, so he was not really enhanced in any other manner. He is only slightly stronger than a normal human, but does have the same rapid healing factor as the other Supertroopers. Stingray speaks in an Australian accent, and Darkstar's lover.

In addition to the powers listed, the Supertroopers also have enhanced reflexes and rapid healing abilities, except for Brainchild, who was not designed for combat.

References 

Adventures of the Galaxy Rangers, The
Lists of animated science fiction television characters